Mark J. Feist (born in Melbourne) is a multi-platinum producer/songwriter who has contributed to the sale of over 25 million records worldwide. Feist currently resides in Los Angeles.

Early age
Mark Feist began expressing himself musically at the age of two when he started taking drum lessons and then later piano lessons at age of six. By the time he was 13, Feist was hired as a drummer/pianist to play on professional recording sessions for commercial jingles in his native Australia. During this time, he ventured into musical composition and record production.

When Feist turned 18, his family moved to the Philippines where he began his career as a professional producer/songwriter. He wrote and produced his first hit record at the age of 18 for the Filipino market. From then on and until he turned 24, Feist had already produced and written over 40 gold and platinum albums for artists all over Asia; primarily for the Japanese, Filipino and Malaysian markets.

Some of the big corporations Feist has worked with in the Asian markets include: Pepsi, Bristol Myers Squibb and Procter & Gamble.

Contributions
Feist is involved with every aspect of the writing, recording and production process of a record; contributing "hands on" at all stages. Not only does he write, produce and arrange, but he also plays many of the instruments on the records he is involved with.

Career in the US
In 1994, at the age of 24, Mark permanently relocated to Los Angeles to start his career in the United States. In 1998, four years later, he had his first hit song in the US. It was titled "I Love You" which he wrote and produced for MCA/SILAS recording artists, Keith Washington and Chante Moore. This hit led to many other productions and co-writes including records for Destiny's Child's No. 1 song "Emotion", which was featured on Survivor and Number 1's. Feist also wrote song for artists such as Kelly Rowland, Celine Dion, Mýa, John Legend, Jennifer Holliday, The Spice Girls, Shanice Wilson, Donnel Jones, Outkast, George Clinton, Aaron Carter, Kimberley Locke, Stacie Orrico, Brian McKnight, Jaya, Jesse Powell, and Regine Velasquez.

In 2002 Mark formed "DNM WORLDWIDE", a production/writer-partnership, with multi-platinum songwriter/producer Damon Sharpe; whose works include the No. 1 hit "Love Don't Cost A Thing" for Jennifer Lopez.  Mark Feist and Damon Sharpe collectively have contributed to the sales of more than 60 million records worldwide in their careers. Feist produced, wrote, and arranged, "Come Together Now", a charity single made to benefit the victims of the 2004 Indian Ocean earthquake/tsunami and Hurricane Katrina in 2005. The song was co-written by Sharon Stone, Damon Sharpe, Mark Feist, and Denise Rich and released on 21 November 2005. It featured over 25 notable artists. In October 2005, Feist appeared on CNN's Larry King Live with Sharon Stone, Denise Rich and Sharpe to promote the release of the single. In March 2007 American Idol alumni Kimberley Locke's second album Based on a True Story was released through Curb/Warner. Feist produced six songs on the album. Three of these songs he co-wrote and the other three he produced and arranged.

In January 2007, DNM WORLDWIDE was dissolved and Feist went back to producing and writing on his own, under his production company "REAL MF LTD."  Feist had used this production company in the past with Destiny's Child and Kelly Rowland. In April 2013, Mark Feist co-wrote and produced "Lightning" and "More Than Just Friends" included as bonus tracks on American Ido alumni Jessica Sanchez's debut album Me, You & the Music as well as Warner's Artist Sabi's single "Cali Love" featuring Tyga. Mark also spent a lot of time in the studio producing and writing with other artists such as Hot Chelle Rae, Candice Glover, Brit Smith and Sabi. In 2014, Feist was working on production and co-writing of songs for Jessica Sanchez's upcoming second studio album, and was credited with production on Mary J. Blige's soundtrack album Think Like a Man Too.

References

External links
 
 

American male songwriters
Living people
1970 births
Musicians from Melbourne
Musicians from Los Angeles
Songwriters from California
Australian emigrants to the United States